Pepper is a given name, nickname and surname. Notable people with the name include:

Surname
 Abel C. Pepper (1793–1860), American politician and Indian agent
 Art Pepper (1925–1982), American jazz musician
 Barry Pepper (born 1970), Canadian actor
 Belville Robert Pepper (1850–1888), British singer
 Bill Pepper (1895–1918), English footballer
 Charles T. Pepper (1830–1903), American physician.  
 Claude Pepper (1900–1989), U.S. Congressman from Florida
 Conor Pepper (born 1994), Irish footballer
 Cuthbert Pepper (died 1608), Member of Parliament in 1597 and 1601
 Daniel Pepper (born 1989), English swimmer
 Dick Pepper (1889–1962), English musician and writer
 Dottie Pepper (born 1965), American golfer
 George W. Pepper (1867–1961), U.S. senator and lawyer
 Harry S. Pepper (1891–1970), English light music composer and BBC producer
 James Welsh Pepper (1853–1919), American music publisher and instrument maker; founded J.W. Pepper & Son in 1876
 Jeffrey Pepper, American politician, member of the Michigan House of Representatives from 2022 to 2023
 Jim Pepper (1941–1992), American jazz musician
 John Henry Pepper (1821–1900), English scientist, inventor, and lecturer
 Nigel Pepper (born 1968), English footballer
 Pamela Pepper (born 1964), American judge
 Sam Pepper (born 1989), English YouTube personality
 Stephen Pepper (1891–1972) American philosopher
 Taybor Pepper (born 1994), American football player
 Tom Pepper (born 1975), computer programmer
 Wendy Pepper (born 1964), American fashion designer
 William Pepper Jr. (1843–1898), Philadelphia physician and founder of the Free Library of Philadelphia
 William Francis Pepper (born 1937), New York City lawyer

Given name or nickname
 Pepper Adams (1930–1986), American jazz saxophonist
 Pepper Binkley, American actress
 Pepper Keenan (born 1967), American rock musician
 Pepper LaBeija (1948–2003), American drag queen and fashion designer
 Pepper Martin (1904–1965), American baseball player
 Pepper MaShay (born 1953), American musician and singer-songwriter
 Pepper Ottman, American politician, member of the Wyoming House of Representatives since 2021
 Pepper Paire (1924–2013), catcher and infielder from the All-American Girls Professional Baseball League
 Pepper Rodgers (1931–2020), American football player and coach
 Pepper Schwartz (born 1945), American sociologist and sexologist
 Pepper Somerset, female vocalist in the American Industrial band My Life With The Thrill Kill Kult
 Pepper Winters, Hong Kong-born American romance novelist

Fictional characters
 Sgt. Leann "Pepper" Anderson, the central character in the 1970s Police Woman TV series, played by Angie Dickinson
 Pepper Brooks, television commentator played by Jason Bateman in Dodgeball: A True Underdog Story
 Pepper Clark, a skunk in the cartoon Littlest Pet Shop
 Pepper Dennis, news reporter in the television show Pepper Dennis played by Rebecca Romijn
 Pepper Ann Pearson, the protagonist and title character in Disney's 1997 animated series Pepper Ann
 Pepper Potts, Tony Stark's assistant and later lover in the Iron Man/Marvel Comics universe
 Pepper Saltzman, a guest character played by Nathan Lane in Modern Family
 Pepper Steiger, in Neighbours
 Floyd Pepper, a puppet character in The Muppet Show
 Suzy Pepper, character in Glee
 the title character of the 1975 film The Great Waldo Pepper, played by Robert Redford
 Pepper, in the musical Annie
 Pepper, a horse in the television series Horseland
 Pepper, in the musical Mamma Mia!
 Pepper, in the webcomic series Pepper&Carrot
 Pepper, in the book Good Omens

See also
 Sgt. Pepper's Lonely Hearts Club Band (disambiguation)
 Peppers (surname)
 Pepper (disambiguation)

English feminine given names
English-language unisex given names